Cacimba de Dentro is a municipality in the state of Paraíba in northeastern Brazil. It is located in the mesoregion of Agreste Paraibano and the microregion of Western Curimataú, 160 km from the state capital, João Pessoa.

References

External links
 Brazilian government data sheet

Municipalities in Paraíba